Charles Marron Fickert (February 23, 1873 – October 19, 1937) was American lawyer, politician, and college football player and coach.  He was the district attorney of San Francisco from 1909 until 1920, best known for prosecuting Thomas Mooney and Warren Billings for the Preparedness Day bombing of 1916.

College and football career
Born in Kern County, California, Fickert entered Stanford University in 1894, where he studied law and played guard on the university's football team. In 1901, Fickert was the first Stanford alumnus to serve as head football coach at his alma mater.  He led Stanford to a 3–2–2 record in 1901 and an appearance in the first ever college football bowl game, the 1902 Rose Bowl, where his team lost, 49–0, to the Michigan Wolverines.

Head coaching record

Political career
Admitted to the California Bar in 1895 in Los Angeles, he arrived in San Francisco and joined the law offices of Edward Robeson Taylor, who soon replaced Mayor Eugene E. Schmitz when Schmitz was indicted during the graft trials.

Fickert's first public office was assistant United States Attorney, serving for two years. He then successfully opposed special prosecutor for the DA's office Francis J. Heney for DA in the fall of 1909. He was regularly reelected until defeat by Matthew Brady in 1920. In 1918, he ran for the Republican nomination for Governor of California, but was defeated by incumbent William Stephens.

Fickert was in office in 1916 and drew national attention and scandal for his prosecution of labor leaders Thomas Mooney and Warren K. Billings during the Preparedness Day Bombing. Witnesses claimed Fickert coached them to perjure themselves in subsequent hearings in order to defend the original convictions. Fickert continued his battles with his fists, first against Heney at the Olympic Club and later against editor Fremont Older at the Palace Hotel.

A 1919 grand jury exonerated Fickert from charges made by John B. Densmore, investigator from Washington, Director General of Employment, in the framing of Mooney and Billings and for his having conspired with Pete McDonough in the freeing of wealthy defendants. President Theodore Roosevelt declared, "anyone assailing Fickert for prosecuting anarchists should be deprived of citizenship".

Later life
Fickert's wife, Ethel Wallace Fickert, obtained a divorce from him in 1935, citing excessive drinking and gambling and was awarded the Fickert home at 1060 Green Street  in San Francisco. Fickert died of pneumonia at October 19, 1937 at Franklin Hospital.

References

Additional sources

External links

 

1873 births
1937 deaths
19th-century players of American football
American football guards
California local politicians
California Republicans
District attorneys in California
Lawyers from San Francisco
Stanford Cardinal football players
Stanford Cardinal football coaches
People from Kern County, California
Coaches of American football from California
Players of American football from California